Byala Cherkva is a town in Pavlikeni Municipality, Veliko Turnovo Province, Central-North Bulgaria. The settlement is located close to the town of Pavlikeni about 28 km away from the city of Veliko Tarnovo. Its name in Bulgarian means white church, a popular placename around the world, equivalent to Bela Crkva, Weisskirchen, Whitechurch, etc.
As of December 2009, the town has a population of 2,612 inhabitants.

Notable natives include the revolutionary Bacho Kiro (1835–1876), the poet and minister of culture Tsanko Tserkovski, and politician Rayko Daskalov.

History 

The first settlement - Byala Cherkva - originated on the higher right bank of the Rositsa river during the first Bulgarian state, as at the beginning of the 13th century. Later the village was known as Murad Bey and Gorni Turcheta. In 1832 people from the village built the first church - "St. Dimitar".

Schools
School "Bacho Kiro"

Church
Church "Saint Dimitar"

Tourism
The town area spots churches, monuments and river bridges.

Gallery

References

Towns in Bulgaria
Populated places in Veliko Tarnovo Province